Stronda is a subgenre of Brazilian hip hop music and a cross-genre that has elements of hip hop, funk, pop, surf music and rock that started in 2004 specifically in Rio de Janeiro with the group Prexeca Bangers Making music counting your day-to-day, a different kind of music, a "hip hop porn" in a short time it was heard by many young people, but have always been censored by the press. Soon in 2006 came  the "Bonde da Stronda", making success in throughout Brazil and being recognized by the media thus bringing the emergence of several other groups.

Outside of Rio de Janeiro there are also stronda music groups, D'Boss is the best known of them because it was the first non-Rio to sing at an event of Stronda music in Rio, D'Boss is from Brasilia. In Minas Gerais has the Divissão dos Playssons which is the first group in the state and each passing day is gaining ground. There is also a group of Bahia that is emerging, known as BS Love.

The style faces prejudice for being in Brazil, where the MC's main theme is of slums and things of the genre, but the idea of Stronda music is bringing the style of "American hip hop" to Brazil with issues related to enjoy the life.

References

Brazilian hip hop
Brazilian styles of music
Hip hop genres